Foundation is a box set by the English rock band Magnum. It was released in 1990 by FM Records.

Track listing 
All Tracks written by Tony Clarkin.

Disc 1: Kingdom of Madness
"In the Beginning" — 7:52
"Baby Rock Me" — 4:05
"Universe" — 3:45
"Kingdom of Madness" — 4:25
"All That Is Real" — 3:48
"Bringer" — 3:58
"Invasion" — 3:22
"Lords of Chaos" — 3:21
"All Come Together" — 4:53

Disc 2: Magnum II
"Great Adventure" — 4:54
"Changes" — 3:15
"The Battle" — 2:10
"If I Could Live Forever" — 4:02
"Reborn" — 5:45
"So Cold the Night" — 4:04
"Foolish Heart" — 3:13
"Stayin' Alive" — 3:22
"Firebird" — 4:47
"All of My Life" — 4:43

Disc 3: Chase the Dragon
"Soldier of the Line" — 4:16
"On the Edge of the World" — 4:22
"The Spirit" — 4:17
"Sacred Hour" — 5:35
"Walking the Straight Line" — 4:53
"We All Play the Game" — 4:07
"The Teacher" — 3:21
"The Lights Burned Out" — 4:32

Disc 4: The Eleventh Hour
 "The Prize" — 3:39
 "Breakdown" — 3:59
 "The Great Disaster" — 3:46
 "Vicious Companions" — 3:36
 "So Far Away" — 4:35
 "Hit and Run" — 3:39
 "One Night of Passion" — 3:48
 "The Word" — 4:54
 "Young and Precious Souls" — 4:03
 "Road to Paradise" — 3:30

Disc 5: On a Storyteller's Night
"How Far Jerusalem" — 6:25
"Just Like an Arrow" — 3:22
"On a Storyteller's Night" — 4:59
"Before First Light" — 3:52
"Les Mort Dansant" — 5:47
"Endless Love" — 4:30
"Two Hearts" — 4:24
"Steal Your Heart" — 3:59
"All England's Eyes" — 4:47
"The Last Dance" — 3:39

Disc 6: Mirador
"Just Like An Arrow" — 3:22
"Soldier of the Line" — 4:16
"Changes" — 3:15
"Sacred Hour" — 5:35
"Great Adventure" — 4:54
"The Lights Burned Out" — 4:32
"In the Beginning" — 7:52
"How Far Jerusalem" — 6:25
"The Spirit" — 4:17
"The Word" — 4:54
"The Prize" — 3:39
"Kingdom of Madness" — 4:25
"If I Could Live Forever" — 4:02
"Lords of Chaos" — 3:21
"On a Storyteller's Night" — 4:59

Cover sleeve
The cover art was designed by Rodney Matthews.

"Foundation was produced at the request of Paul Birch for the cover of a Magnum boxed set, containing the albums  Kingdom Of Madness, Magnum II, Chase The Dragon, The Eleventh Hour, On A Storyteller's Night and Mirador. The idea was to include items from each album in the design: the stag from Mirador, the city from Chase The Dragon, my dog Patch from On A Storyteller's Night, and so on. The box contained a poster and an illustrated booklet. The title Foundation was my own contribution, as was the man with the hat (Tony Clarkin ploughing his way through the difficulties of a life in rock!)." — Rodney Matthews

Personnel
Tony Clarkin — guitar
Bob Catley — vocals
Wally Lowe — bass guitar
Richard Bailey — keyboards, flute
Kex Gorin — drums
Mark Stanway — keyboards
Jim Simpson — drums

Additional musicians
Mo Birch — backing vocals (on "Les Mort Dansant")

References

External links
 www.magnumonline.co.uk — Official Magnum site
 Record Covers — at rodneymatthews.com

Albums produced by Leo Lyons
Albums produced by Tony Clarkin
Magnum (band) compilation albums
1990 compilation albums
Albums with cover art by Rodney Matthews
Albums produced by Jeff Glixman